Lago Jeinimeni National Reserve is a nature reserve of Chile located in the Aysén del General Carlos Ibáñez del Campo Region, south of Chile Chico. The reserve is named after Jeinimeni Lake, a milky turquoise lake. A highlight of the reserve is the Cueva de las Manos (Cave of the Hands), an archaeological site of a similar nature to those of its more famous counterpart, Cueva de las Manos.

A new, 25,000 km2 national park called Patagonia National Park will combine Lago Cochrane National Reserve, Lago Jeinimeni National Reserve and the privately owned Patagonia Park.

References

Protected areas of Aysén Region
National reserves of Chile